Lake Jackson is a shallow, prairie lake on the north side of Leon County, Florida, United States, near Tallahassee, with two major depressions or sinkholes known as Porter Sink and Lime Sink.

There is no outflow from streams or runoff.

Geography
Interstate 10 runs across the southern tip of the lake.

There is another Lake Jackson and Little Lake Jackson in Sebring, Florida, not related to the current article.

The Lake Jackson Mounds Archaeological State Park is located adjacent to the lake.

Geology

Karst

Drainage

Water drains from the lake into the Floridan Aquifer through the sinkholes. These are usually partially or completely plugged with sediments, but collapse when groundwater levels drop, allowing lake water to funnel into the aquifer, which can completely drain the lake.  This has occurred on numerous occasions. Newspaper accounts report draining episodes in 1829, and again in 1840 and 1860. Sellards reports that the lake drained though a sinkhole in June 1907 and drained again during the summer of 1909. Lake Jackson drained again in November 1918, and yet again in January 1932 and October 1936. The lake drained in 1956-1957, and again in 1981-1982. More recently, Lake Jackson drained in 1999, May 2007, June 2012 and most recently in June 2021.
During the 2007 drainage, the lake flowed down the Porter Sink, but pools of water still remained.

Ecology

Fauna

Large numbers of waterfowl species are found at Lake Jackson. These include great blue heron, little blue heron, great egret, snowy egret, limpkin, Moorhen, American coot, wood stork, osprey, bald eagle, fish crow, and least tern. Common reptiles and amphibians include the American alligator, Southern chorus frog, Southern leopard frog, and the Florida softshell turtle. Among the mammals that inhabit the shoreline is the round-tailed muskrat. Brown pelicans, rare inland, have also been found on occasion.

Flora

Submerged vegetation is abundant throughout the lake and include blue hyssop, coontail, green fanwort, variable-leaf milfoil, and bladderwort. Marsh plants include maidencane, pickerelweed, American lotus, and slender spikerush. Numerous wetland tree and woody plant species also inhabit the drier portions of the transitional marsh. These include sweetgum, a variety of oaks, wax myrtle, the Carolina willow (salix caroliniana), and elderberry. Exotic invasive species have also established themselves in some areas, including Chinese tallow and hydrilla.

Preservation 
Lake Jackson is part of the Lake Jackson Aquatic Preserve, along with Lake Carr and Mallard Pond. The preserve was established in 1973.

References

External links

1940 map of Lake Jackson & community
Lake Jackson Aquatic Preserve
Ochlockonee River Watershed and Lake Jackson Protection - Florida DEP
Lake Jackson Ecopassage
Land & Water Magazine: Restoring a Disappearing Lake
Lake Jackson Mounds Archaeological Park
Friends of Lake Jackson
Video of Lake Jackson Drydown, December, 2002 (NWFWMD)

Jackson
Geography of Tallahassee, Florida
Jackson